Kauer is a German surname.

This surname is shared by the following people:

 Erich Kauer (1908–1989), German international footballer
 Ferdinand Kauer (1751–1831), Austrian composer and pianist
 Sophie Kauer (born 2001), British-German cellist and actress
 Wolfgang Kauer (born 1957), Austrian author

See also 
 Cauer

German-language surnames